"Faded Love" is a song recorded by American singer Tinashe featuring guest vocals from American rapper Future. It was written by Tinashe, Future, Sasha Sloan, Noonie Bao, as well as Tor Erik Hermansen from the song's production team Stargate. It was released commercially for digital download via RCA Records on February 12, 2018, as the second single from Tinashe's third studio album, Joyride (2018).

Background
The song was first revealed in a picture Tinashe posted on social media on January 12, 2018. She spoke of the song in an interview on Beats 1: "'Faded Love' is kind of more muted, it's a little bit more R&B, it's a little more sensual, mid-tempo." Talking about working with Future, she said: "Future's on my first album and that was one of my favorite songs on the first album, but I felt like it was pretty underrated. So I was like, 'It would be perfect to have him back again.' I thought this song was really an interesting song to put him on because it was a little more unexpected, a little bit more muted, and not necessarily like a trap music, or something that would be obvious. It's a kind of new flavor." In another interview with AOL, Tinashe said: "The song's vibe is just so special. It's this muted, almost careless tone. It has this darkness to it, which I love. I was really drawn to those elements and even how the instrumentation with its muted drums. To me, the song really represents that feeling of being indifferent to love."

Critical reception
Madeline Roth of MTV News described the song as "promising", writing that it features "glitchy beat and murky synths". Sam Prance of the same publication praised the song, writing: "Future sounds amazing on it and it's Tinashe at her most captivating. It's more lowkey than 'No Drama' but no less hypnotic. Hugh McIntyre of Fuse deemed the song "a subdued affair", writing: "Both her delivery and the production mimic the name of the song". Comparing to Tinashe's previous single "No Drama" featuring Offset, which was also produced by Stargate, Eddie Fu of Consequence of Sound noted the song of being "more of a duet than a typical singer and rapper collaboration". Chris DeVille of Stereogum wrote: "The song benefits from some compelling electronics-infused production from Stargate and a contagious twilight mood." Mike Wass of Idolator regarded the song as "a return to the slinky hip-hop/pop fusion of Aquarius", which follows the trend started with "No Drama".

Credits and personnel 
Recording and management
Mixed at Larrabee Sound Studios (North Hollywood, California)
Mastered at Chris Athens Masters (Austin, Texas)
Published by Shaybug Music/Sony/ATV Songs LLC (BMI), EMI April Music, Inc. (ASCAP) obo EMI Music Publishing Ltd. (PRS, EMI Music Publishing Scandinavia (BMI/STIM), Sasha Sloan Publishing/Mod Junkie/Warner-Tamerlane Publishing Corp. (BMI), Nayvadius Maximus Music/Irving Music, Inc. (BMI)
Future appears courtesy of A1 Recordings/Epic Records.

Personnel
Tinashe – lead vocals, composition
Future – featured artist, composition
Tor Erik Hermansen – composition, production, all instruments, programming
Noonie Bao – composition
Sasha Sloan – composition
Mikkel S. Eriksen – production, all instruments, programming
Jaycen Joshua – mixing
David Nakaji – mixing assistant
Ben Milchev – mixing assistant
Chris Athens – mastering

Credits adapted from the liner notes of Joyride.

Charts

References

2018 singles
2018 songs
RCA Records singles
Tinashe songs
Future (rapper) songs
Songs written by Future (rapper)
Songs written by Noonie Bao
Song recordings produced by Stargate (record producers)
Electro songs
Songs written by Tor Erik Hermansen
Songs written by Tinashe
Songs written by Sasha Alex Sloan
Songs written by Mikkel Storleer Eriksen
Vertically-oriented music videos